Nerkin Bazmaberd, formerly known as Agdzhakala, Aghjaghala, Nerkin Agdzhakala, or Nerkin Hajighala, is a village in the Talin Municipality of the Aragatsotn Province of Armenia. It was renamed Nerkin Bazmaberd on November 12, 1946. The population descends from refugees and migrants from the occupied Sasun and Mush provinces of the Ottoman Empire (current Turkey) in 1915–1918.

References 

World Gazetteer: Armenia – World-Gazetteer.com
Report of the results of the 2001 Armenian Census

Populated places in Aragatsotn Province